Sanbokan (Citrus sulcata Takahashi, :ja:さんぼうかん or 'Sanbokan') is a Japanese citrus fruit of the Wakayama prefecture similar to a mandarin orange, easily distinguished by its pronounced basal nipple.

Parentage is unknown. Fruit is moderately juicy and of a good flavor. 'Sanbokan' is late ripening. Its juice is a blend of sweet orange and grapefruit, also it has thick peel.

Medicinal
Researchers at the Yuanpei University said that they have evaluated the antioxidant and anti-inflammatory activities of the 'sanbokan' extracts.

References

 Learn2Grow article

Citrus
Japanese fruit